Dr. Renato Giuseppe Bosisio (1930–2019)  was a Québécois Canadian academic and expert on microwave engineering. He is also known for returning the Order of Canada in protest of Henry Morgentaler's appointment to the Order.

Positions
Bosisio is a professor emeritus at the École Polytechnique de Montréal, Department of Electrical Engineering.

Notability
Bosisio has authored and/or coauthor over 300 academic papers and refereed international conferences. In them, he has made global contributions in developing microwave and millimeter wave engineering. He also holds 12 patents.

In 1992, he founded the Poly-GRAMES Research Center.

Accolades
On January 14, 2002, Bosisio was appointed to the Order of Canada. On November 30, 2009, he resigned in protest of Henry Morgentaler's appointment to the Order.

On May 3, 2004, Bosisio was awarded the McNaughton Medal of IEEE Canada Outstanding Educator Award for "research and teaching of microwaves and innovation of six-port based digital receivers" in 2004.

References

2019 deaths
Members of the Order of Canada
1930 births
Canadian people of Italian descent